This is a list of churches on the island of Bornholm in eastern Denmark.

The list

See also 

 Diocese of Copenhagen
 List of windmills on Bornholm

References 

 
Bornholm